Prepotenti più di prima is a 1959 Italian comedy film directed by Mario Mattoli and starring Aldo Fabrizi. It is the sequel of I prepotenti.

Plot
On her return from the honeymoon, Marcella finds out she is expecting a baby. The future grandparents argue again about where the baby is to be born and the choice of a name. The newlyweds, tired of the quarrels, decide to flee to Milan with their baby.

Cast
 Aldo Fabrizi - Cesare Pinelli
 Nino Taranto - Domenico Esposito
 Ave Ninchi - Clelia Pinelli
 Luca Ronconi - Gennarino Esposito
 Alice Sandro - Marcella
 Virgilio Riento - Il maresciallo
 Margherita Bagni - La signora Esposito
 Ferruccio Amendola - Alfredo Pinelli
 Anna Campori - Signora Norma
 Alberto Sorrentino - Mimmo
 Nino Vingelli - Il barista

References

External links

Prepotenti più di prima at Variety Distribution

1959 films
1950s Italian-language films
1959 comedy films
Italian black-and-white films
Films directed by Mario Mattoli
Italian comedy films
Films with screenplays by Mario Amendola
1950s Italian films